Canosa Sannita is a comune and town in the province of Chieti, Abruzzo, central Italy.

Economy is mostly based on agriculture (wine, olive oil, fruit). Craftmanship and summer tourism are also active.

See also
Abruzzo (wine)

References

Cities and towns in Abruzzo